Amina Rakhim (born 22 February 1989) is a Kazakhstani retired tennis player.

She took part in the 2007 Bangalore Open but lost in the final qualifying round to Sun Shengnan. On 10 September 2007, she reached her career-high singles ranking of 259. On 25 February 2008, she peaked at No. 215 in the doubles rankings.

In 2007, she won the biggest title of her career, winning a $50k doubles title. Rakhim played her last professional match in November 2008.

ITF finals

Singles: 4 (1–3)

Doubles: 4 (4–0)

External links
 
 

Kazakhstani female tennis players
Universiade medalists in tennis
Living people
1989 births
Universiade silver medalists for Kazakhstan
Medalists at the 2007 Summer Universiade
21st-century Kazakhstani women